Coșoveni is a commune in Dolj County, Oltenia, Romania with a population of 4,982 people. It is composed of a single village, Coșoveni. It also included Cârcea village until 2004, when it was split off to form a separate commune.

Gallery

External links 

 Official Site

References

Communes in Dolj County
Localities in Oltenia